Duckens Nazon (born 7 April 1994) is a professional footballer who plays as a striker for Bulgarian First League club CSKA Sofia. Born in France, he represents the Haiti national team at international level.

Club career
After going through the youth system at Vannes, Nazon joined Lorient's reserve team in 2013. Later that year, he joined French fourth-tier side US Roye.

After brief stints at Olympique Saint-Quentin and Stade Lavallois, he joined Kerala Blasters in the Indian Super League in September 2016.

Three months later, on 13 January 2017, he signed a six-month deal with English Championship side Wolverhampton Wanderers, becoming part of their under-23 team. On 4 August 2017, he went out on loan to League Two side Coventry City until January 2018. He made his English league debut for the club the following day as a substitute in a 3–0 win against Notts County. On 8 August 2017 he scored his first goal in English football, scoring in the Sky Blues' 3–1 League Cup defeat to Blackburn. He scored 8 goals in 24 appearances in all competitions in his six-month loan spell. The club later gained promotion to League One via the play-offs.
Nazon was then loaned out to League One side Oldham Athletic until the end of the season. He scored six goals in 16 appearances for the club as they saw relegation to League Two.
On 14 June 2018, Nazon joined Belgian First Division A club Sint-Truiden on a three-year-deal for an undisclosed fee. In January 2019, Nazon joined Scottish Premiership side St Mirren on loan until the end of the season. On 26 July 2021, Nazon joined Ligue 2 side Quevilly-Rouen on a free transfer.

International career

Nazon earned his first cap for the Haiti national team on 5 March 2014 against Kosovo (draw 0–0).

In the 2015 Gold Cup, Nazon scored the only two goals for Haiti in the group stage, helping his team get second place and advancing to the knockout stage.

On 10 September 2018, in a competitive game against Sint Maarten, he scored five goals, a record for Haiti.

Career statistics

Club

International
Scores and results list Haiti's goal tally first, score column indicates score after each Nazon goal.

References

External links

Duckens Nazon profile at FHF

1994 births
Living people
People from Châtenay-Malabry
French sportspeople of Haitian descent
Footballers from Hauts-de-Seine
Haitian footballers
French footballers
Footballers from Paris
Association football forwards
Haiti international footballers
2014 Caribbean Cup players
2015 CONCACAF Gold Cup players
Copa América Centenario players
2019 CONCACAF Gold Cup players
2021 CONCACAF Gold Cup players
Ligue 2 players
Championnat National 2 players
Championnat National 3 players
Indian Super League players
English Football League players
Belgian Pro League players
Scottish Professional Football League players
Olympique Saint-Quentin players
Stade Lavallois players
Oldham Athletic A.F.C. players
Kerala Blasters FC players
Wolverhampton Wanderers F.C. players
Coventry City F.C. players
Sint-Truidense V.V. players
St Mirren F.C. players
PFC CSKA Sofia players
First Professional Football League (Bulgaria) players
Haitian expatriate footballers
Haitian expatriate sportspeople in India
Expatriate footballers in India
Haitian expatriate sportspeople in England
Expatriate footballers in England
Haitian expatriate sportspeople in Belgium
Expatriate footballers in Belgium
Haitian expatriate sportspeople in Scotland
Expatriate footballers in Scotland